Giulia Pignolo (born 26 July 1980) is an Italian sailor. She competed in the Yngling event at the 2008 Summer Olympics.

References

External links
 

1980 births
Living people
Italian female sailors (sport)
Olympic sailors of Italy
Sailors at the 2008 Summer Olympics – Yngling
Sportspeople from Trieste